Went can mean:

Surname 
 Frits Went (1863–1935), Dutch botanist who used the standard author abbreviation "Went"
 Louise Went (1865–1951)
 Frits Warmolt Went (1903–1990), Dutch biologist and child of Frits Went
 George Went Hensley (1881–1955), American Pentecostal minister and snake-handler
 Gwilym Went (1914–2005), Welsh cricketer
 Jamie Went (born 1982), English cricketer
 Johanna Went, American performance artist
 John Went (born 1944), former Anglican Bishop of Tewkesbury
 Joseph J. Went (born 1930), retired United States Marine Corps four-star general
 Kingsley Went (born 1981), Zimbabwean cricketer
 Paul Went (1949–2017), English footballer

Other uses 
 Cholodny–Went model, a biological model of tropism devised by Frits Warmolt Went
 River Went, a river in Yorkshire, England
 WENT (1340 AM), a radio station in Gloversville, New York
 Went Mountains frog (Papurana grisea), an Indonesian frog
 Went (verb), the past tense of the verb go

See also 
 Wend (disambiguation)
 Wendt
 Wentz